Ohlsdorf may refer to:

 Ohlsdorf, Hamburg
 Ohlsdorf Cemetery
 Ohlsdorf, Austria

See also 
 Olsdorf